The 1922 Oregon Webfoots football team represented the University of Oregon in the Pacific Coast Conference (PCC) during the 1922 college football season.  In their fifth season under head coach Charles A. Huntington, the Webfoots compiled a 6–1–1 record (3–0–1 against PCC opponents), finished in second place in the PCC, and outscored their opponents, 99 to 26. The team played its home games at Hayward Field in Eugene, Oregon.

Schedule

References

Oregon
Oregon Ducks football seasons
Oregon Webfoots football